Kenneth William Newton  (17 April 1924 – 3 November 2006) was an Australian rules footballer who played for Essendon and Hawthorn in the Victorian Football League (VFL).

War Service
Newton enlisted to serve in the Australian Army at Duntroon in Canberra in December 1944. In July 1945 he was awarded the Military Cross for "outstanding personal courage at Ulupu, New Guinea" displayed in combat with Japanese troops. Newton remained in the Army until May 1951.

Football
Newton was recruited locally to Essendon and played as a reserve in their 1947 Grand Final loss to Carlton. He kicked five goals in a game at Princes Park against the same opponents the following season. Newton often struggled to make the seniors in what was a strong Essendon side so during the 1950 season crossed to Hawthorn.

References

External links

1924 births
2006 deaths
Australian rules footballers from Melbourne
Essendon Football Club players
Hawthorn Football Club players
People educated at Wesley College (Victoria)
Australian recipients of the Military Cross
Military personnel from Melbourne
Australian Army personnel of World War II